2018 Giravanz Kitakyushu season.

Squad
As of February 1, 2018.

J3 League

References

External links
 J.League official site

Giravanz Kitakyushu
Giravanz Kitakyushu seasons